Edgar Bold (7 October 1899 – 9 July 1965) was a New Zealand cricketer. He played in one first-class match for Wellington in 1919/20.

See also
 List of Wellington representative cricketers

References

External links
 

1899 births
1965 deaths
New Zealand cricketers
Wellington cricketers
Cricketers from Wellington City